Hidden Lake is a lake on the Kenai Peninsula of Alaska, formed by an ancient channel of the Kenai River. It is located entirely inside the Kenai National Wildlife Refuge. Being in the foothills of the Kenai Mountains, much of the shoreline is very steep, and wooded with birch and spruce trees. The only outflow from the lake is Hidden Creek, a short, shallow creek that flows into the Kenai River just North of Skilak Lake.

Access
There is a US Fish and Wildlife Service developed campground with 44 campsites and a boat launch at the lake. The campground has handicapped accessibility. It can be accessed via Skilak Lake Road; the only other land access is to the other end of the lake via the Seven Lakes Trail. Airplane landings are only permitted for winter access to ice fishing. The campground was upgraded in 1989. Since the 1990s, campground hosts have been recruited each summer; they live in their own campers or trailers on site and receive a weekly stipend. The 2019 Swan Lake Fire burned some areas on the north shore of the lake, but firefighters were able to save the campground by employing "burnout" strategy, creating a back burn with driptorches alongside the adjacent highway.

Wildlife
The lake and creek are noted for the presence of both brown and black bears. Refuge regulations specify that food, garbage, and other items likely to attract bears be properly stowed in a hard-shelled vehicle or a certified bearproof container at all times when not in immediate use. Other terrestrial mammals include squirrels, weasels, muskrats, and moose. Small birds in the area include jays, thrushes, juncos, warblers, and chickadees. There are also ravens and other corvids as well as bald eagles. Waterfowl commonly spotted in the area include the red-necked grebe, common loon, and Pacific loon.

The lake is home to sockeye salmon that migrate in the tens of thousands, with fry leaving in early June, and spawning adults returning in June and July. Other fish species include Arctic char, coho salmon, lake trout, and rainbow trout.

References
 

Lakes of Kenai Peninsula Borough, Alaska